Francis Makemie (1658–1708) was an Ulster Scots clergyman, considered to be the founder of Presbyterianism in the United States of America.

Early and family life
Makemie was born in Ramelton, County Donegal, Ireland (part of the Province of Ulster). He attended the University of Glasgow, where he underwent a religious conversion and enrolled as "Franciscus Makemus Scoto-Hyburnus". He went on to be ordained a minister by the Presbytery of Laggan in West Ulster in 1681.

Ten years after emigrating to America in 1682, Makemie married Naomi Anderson, the daughter of a successful Maryland businessman and landowner. They had two daughters, Anne and Elizabeth.

Ministry in America

At the behest of Colonel William Stevens, an Episcopalian from Rehobeth, Maryland, Rev. Makemie was sent as a missionary to America, arriving in Maryland in 1683. Makemie initially preached in Somerset County, Maryland and established the Rehobeth Presbyterian Church the oldest Presbyterian Church in America,  near the Coventry Parish Church which Col. Stevens attended. The ruins of Coventry Parish Church still stand nearby.

Makemie also supported himself as a merchant and traveled among other Scots-Irish communities, many of which were isolated, as well as suspicious of each other. 

In eastern Somerset County (which became Worcester County, Maryland in 1742, where All Hallows Episcopal Church would be erected about a decade later), Makemie founded the first Presbyterian community in the Town of Snow Hill, which had been founded in 1686 and named for a London neighborhood. Snow Hill was to be the center of the Presbytery of Snow Hill, which received a charter from Maryland's General Assembly, but was never activated.

Nonetheless, a Presbyterian Church was erected early on in Snow Hill, and the current Makemie Memorial Presbyterian Church is the fourth building and the site, as well as the congregation's third location in Snow Hill. The first building was near the Pocomoke River, which was the chief means of travel in the 17th and early 18th centuries and how Makemie often traveled to visit his congregations at Rehoboth and further away, as well on what later became U.S. Route 13 down the Delmarva Peninsula. This log building was replaced by a frame building, a little further away from the water but still subject to flooding.

Makemie traveled widely on along the American coast between North Carolina and New York, as well as participating in the West Indies Trade. In 1692, the year Makemie was granted land in Accomack County, Virginia, he and seven other Presbyterian ministers gathered in Philadelphia, Pennsylvania and either then or in 1706 founded what later came to be known as the Presbytery of Philadelphia, the first in America, with Makemie as its moderator. He also helped found churches in Salisbury, Princess Anne, Berlin and Pocomoke City as well as in two places on the Eastern Shore of Virginia, both in Accomack County further down the Delmarva Peninsula.

In 1691, Makemie's 'Catechism' attacked some of the tenets of the Society of Friends. Abolitionist Quaker George Keith, then published a reply. Makemie responded in the 'Answer' already mentioned, which Congregational Rev. Increase Mather thought by "a reverent and judicious minister". 

While living in Barbados, Makemie on 28 December 1696 wrote 'Truths in a True Light, or a Pastoral Letter to the Reformed Protestants in Barbadoes', which was published at Edinburgh in 1699, the year he returned to Accomac and produced a certificate from Barbados and was allowed to preach in his own dwelling in Pocomoke, Maryland, or at designated locations in Accomac, Virginia. He then went to London to resolve questions about his handling episcopal duties in his ministry, and brought back two missionaries.

In 1707, Makemie was arrested by Lord Cornbury, the Governor of New York, for preaching without a license from the Crown as required under the Toleration Act.  He spent two months in jail before being released on bail. Then at trial he produced his preaching license from Barbados, whereupon he was acquitted and released, but had incurred heavy legal costs. This became a landmark case in favor of religious freedom in America. The controversial Lord Cornbury was also recalled to England the following year.

Death and legacy

Makemie and his wife Naomi bought a plantation along Holdens Creek at Temperanceville, Virginia in Accomack County, not far from the county seat. There he spent his final years and died in 1708. The community there he helped found still exists.

Circa the 200th anniversary of the Presbyterian Church's founding, outsiders were appalled to find Makemie's gravesite on the former plantation in dilapidated condition. They stabilized it and erected a statue and memorial marker. Around that time, the surrounding community was experiencing economic prosperity, and renovated the church he had founded in Accomac, Virginia (named after the founder), as well as bought a disused Methodist church nearby in Onancock, Virginia and after demolishing it to erect a new structure named it after his supportive wife Naomi in 1903. Recently, development pressures in Temperanceville, Virginia led the statue and memorial marker to be moved to behind the Accomac church.

Makemie Woods campground, owned and operated by the Presbytery of Eastern Virginia of the Presbyterian Church (USA), is named for Francis Makemie. The camp is located between Williamsburg and Richmond, Virginia.

See also
List of people on stamps of Ireland
Presbyterian Church in Ireland
Presbyterian Church (USA)
County Donegal
Ulster
Ireland
Republic of Ireland
Northern Ireland

References

External links

The Francis Makemie Site
Colonial Delmarva Described In Essays Of Francis Makemie - Delmarva Heritage Series

1658 births
1708 deaths
17th-century Irish people
People from Ramelton
Alumni of the University of Glasgow
Kingdom of Ireland emigrants to the Thirteen Colonies
People of colonial Maryland
American Presbyterian ministers
Irish Presbyterian ministers
People of the Province of New York
American people of Scotch-Irish descent
Ulster Scots people
Virginia colonial people
People from Accomack County, Virginia